Phillip Damone Bond (born July 27, 1954) is a retired American basketball player.

Born in Paducah, Kentucky, Bond attended Manual High School in Louisville, where he graduated third in his class of 312 in 1972. He played collegiately for the University of Louisville.

In 1975 he started for Denny Crum's second team to reach the Final Four and was selected Most Valuable Player in the NCAA Midwest Region Tournament. He also played on the United States Pan American team that won a gold medal. He was an All-American in 1976 and broke Jim Price's assist record, which stood for 14 years.  In addition, he was selected as an Academic All-American in 1976.

He was selected by the Houston Rockets in the 3rd round (62nd pick overall) of the 1977 NBA Draft.

He played for the Rockets (1977–78) in the NBA for 7 games.

In 1983, Bond joined the staff of Metro United Way in Louisville, Kentucky. He is currently the chief financial officer of the organization.

In 2013, his son, Jordan Bond, was a walk-on with the University of Louisville basketball team that won the men's NCAA national championship.

References

External links

1954 births
Living people
American chief financial officers
American men's basketball players
Basketball players at the 1975 Pan American Games
Basketball players from Louisville, Kentucky
Houston Rockets draft picks
Houston Rockets players
Louisville Cardinals men's basketball players
Medalists at the 1975 Pan American Games
Pan American Games gold medalists for the United States
Pan American Games medalists in basketball
Point guards